Main battle tanks are often classified as belonging to a particular generation although the actual definition and membership in these generations is not defined. Soviet military planners organize tanks with the first generation of tanks up to 1950, and four generations of tanks (with the first main battle tank being the third-generation T-64), while American strategists organize main battle tanks into three generations. The military of the People's Republic of China also recognizes three generations of its own tanks.

In 1973, Rolf Hilmes saw three tank generations and three "intermediate generations", which consisted mainly of upgraded vehicles. The first generation of main battle tanks were based on or influenced by designs of World War II, most notably the Soviet T-34. The second generation was equipped with NBC protection (only sometimes), night vision devices, a stabilized main gun and at least a mechanical fire control system. The third generation is in Western parlance determined by the usage of thermal imagers, digital fire control systems and special (composite) armour (Soviet doctrine, however, de-emphasizes thermal vision and electronic fire control, preferring large-caliber gun and engines of high power).

However, Hilmes acknowledged that tanks cannot be definitively grouped by generations, as each tank-producing country develops and introduces its tanks in tune with its own ideas and needs. He also states that breakdown of postwar tanks by generations is based on timeframe and technical factors, as a basis for further discussion.

Generations

First

Second
The second generation had enhanced night-fighting capabilities and in most cases NBC protection. Most western tanks of this generation were armed with the 105 mm Royal Ordnance L7 tank gun or derivatives of it.

Third
The third generation of main battle tanks is characterized by composite armour and computer stabilized fire control systems, which allow firing on the move as well as very high first hit probability on targets up to 2,000 meters away.

Modernized
These are third-generation tanks modernized with fourth-generation technology.

Fourth/next
Next generation or fourth generation tanks are still under development or at early stages of their generation. While the term "(fourth) next generation" has no formal basis, these main battle tanks are using the latest technology and designs to compete in the current advanced warfare environment.

See also

 Armored bulldozer
 Armoured car
 Armored personal carrier (APC)
 Armoured fighting vehicle (AFV)
 Armoured fighting vehicle classification
 Armoured recovery vehicle
 Armoured vehicle-launched bridge
 ASM Program (cancelled due to the end of the Cold War)
 Cruiser tank
 Future Combat Systems Manned Ground Vehicles
 Future Combat Systems
 Future Force Unit of Action
 Heavy tank
 Improvised fighting vehicle
 Infantry fighting vehicle (IFV)
 Infantry mobility vehicle
 Infantry tank
 Light tank
 List of armoured fighting vehicles
 List of armoured trains
 List of main battle tanks by country
 List of modern armoured fighting vehicles
 List of U.S. military vehicles by model number
 Mech
 Medium Mine Protected Vehicle
 Medium Tank
 Military engineering vehicle
 Reconnaissance vehicle
 Super-heavy tank
 Tank destroyer
 Tankette

Explanatory notes 

 Note to the Pancerni website source: Translation of most important parts of 1st, 2nd, 2.5 and 3rd generation MBTs characteristics: "The first generation MBTs are tanks made immediately after WWII. The second generation MBTs have better sights in comparison to the first generation MBTs. Also second generation MBTs were the first ones to use laser sights and APFSDS rounds. The third generation consists of tanks armed with high caliber and velocity guns like M1A1 Abrams. Third generation tanks also use composite armour as well as armour made out of highly resistant sintered ceramic materials. Third generation tanks also have full stabilization system for the main gun. There are tanks between second and third generations, like Soviet T-72 which has powerful gun which would classify it as a third generation MBT but at the same time the stabilization system is much too primitive for it to a third generation MBT. It also lacks engine power to be a third generation MBT and has ammunition with less quality."

Citations

General bibliography 
  
 
 

 
Armoured warfare
Main battle tanks
Main battle tanks